Femmes françaises (French: French women) was a French-language feminist and communist women's magazine which was launched in 1944. The publisher of the magazine was France d'abord. The magazine was published on a weekly basis. In 1948 the magazine sold 5,600 copies. It ceased publication in 1957. Its successor is another feminist magazine, Clara.

From October 1949 to May 1952 Élise Fraysse was redactor in chief of Femmes françaises. In 1952 her coverage of events leading to Tunisian independence resulted in her imprisonment.

References

External links
WorldCat

1944 establishments in France
1957 disestablishments in France
Defunct magazines published in France
Communist magazines
Feminism in France
Feminist magazines
French-language magazines
Magazines established in 1944
Magazines disestablished in 1957
Magazines published in Paris
Women's magazines published in France
Weekly magazines published in France